Mondo Garaj is the debut studio album and fourth album by jazz fusion band Garaj Mahal.

The album was recorded in late 2000 and early 2001 at In The Pocket Studio in Sonoma County, CA, then mixed/mastered over 2001 and 2002 at Talcott Mountain Studio in Simsbury, CT, The Plant Studios in Sausalito, CA, Phelps Studios in San Francisco, CA, and Fluffland Studio in San Anselmo, CA, and finally released in 2003 on Harmonized Records.

Track listing
Mondo Garaj (Eckhardt) - 5:33 
Hindi Gumbo (Haque) - 5:31 
Be Dope (Hertz, Levy) - 6:11 
Junct (Haque) - 6:22 
Poodle Factory (Hertz) - 3:51 
The Big Smack Down (Eckhardt) - 0:35 
New Meeting (Hertz) - 8:04 
Beware My Ethnic Heart (Haque) - 9:11 
Madagascar (Hertz, Levy) - 5:21 
Gulam Sabri (Haque) - 7:47 
Bajo (Hertz) - 7:07 
Milk Carton Blues (Levy) - 3:06

Personnel

Musical
Fareed Haque - Guitar, Guitar (Electric), Guitar (Steel), Sitar (Electric) 
Alan Hertz - Drums, Art Direction, Mixing, Photography, Cover Photo, Roland Synthesizer
Eric Levy - Keyboards, Organ (Hammond), Clavinet, Fender Rhodes, Mini Moog, Oberheim OB8, Prophet 5, Sequential Circuits 
Kai Eckhardt - Bass
Michael Kang - Fiddle, Mandolin 
DJ Fly - Agaric 23 Turntables 
DJ Roto - Turntables, Sampling, Effects

Technical
Garaj Mahal - Arranger, Producer, Art Direction, Mixing 
Christian Weyers - Producer, Executive Producer 
Toni Fishman - Executive Producer 
Justin Phelps - Engineer 
John Cuniberti - Mastering Engineer
Jason Andrew - Assistant Engineer 
Mark Fassler - Assistant Engineer 
Theresa Reed - Photography 
David "Hot Rod" Shuman - Mixing Assistant

External links
Garaj Mahal official website
Fareed Haque official website
Kai Eckhardt official website
Eric Levy official website
Harmonized Records official website
In The Pocket Studio official website
Justin Phelps webpage
John Cuniberti official website

2003 albums
Garaj Mahal albums